Kudjape is a small borough in Saaremaa Parish, Saare County, in northeastern Estonia. As of 2011 Census, the settlement's population was 574.

References

Boroughs and small boroughs in Estonia